Michael Wayne Green (born December 6, 1976) is a former American football safety and cornerback.  He was drafted by the Chicago Bears in the seventh round of the 2000 NFL Draft. He played college football at Northwestern State.

Green also played for the Seattle Seahawks and the Washington Redskins. He retired in 2008.

College career
Green attended college at Northwestern State University in Natchitoches, Louisiana. He earned four letters with the Demons from 1996–1999.

Professional career

Chicago Bears
Green was the last player drafted in the 2000 NFL Draft, a spot which earns the drafted player the dubious distinction of "Mr. Irrelevant." Green played for the Chicago Bears from 2000 to 2005. During his career in Chicago he once recorded a 100-tackle season and was described as "a vital cog in the Bears' secondary."

Seattle Seahawks
Green was acquired by the Seattle Seahawks in an April 2006 trade with the Bears in exchange for a sixth round pick. On August 26, 2006, he suffered a lisfranc fracture and was placed on injured reserve. Green functioned as a backup safety and cornerback during the 2007 season. He was released from the Seahawks on July 25, 2008.

Washington Redskins
Green signed with the Washington Redskins on October 14, 2008, taking the roster spot of Reed Doughty, who was placed on the injured reserve after suffering a back injury.  He was not re-signed following the end of the season making him a free agent.

References

1976 births
Living people
American football cornerbacks
American football safeties
Chicago Bears players
Northwestern State Demons football players
Players of American football from Louisiana
Seattle Seahawks players
Sportspeople from Ruston, Louisiana
Washington Redskins players